Park Street Congregational Church, founded in 1804, is a historic and active congregational church in Downtown Boston, Massachusetts. The Park Street Church is a member of the Conservative Congregational Christian Conference. Typical attendance averages over 2,000 people across all Sunday services. Church membership records are private, but the congregation has over 1,200 members. The church is located at 1 Park Street, at the corner of Tremont Street.

History
Park Street Church is a stop on Boston's Freedom Trail. The founding of the church is dated to 1804 when the "Religious Improvement Society" began weekly meetings with lectures and prayer.  The society organized the church on February 27, 1809. Twenty-six local people, mostly former members of the Old South Meeting House, wanted to create a church with orthodox Trinitarian theology.

The church's cornerstone was laid on May 1, 1809, and construction was completed by the end of the year, under the guidance of Peter Banner (architect), Benajah Young (chief mason) and Solomon Willard (woodcarver). Banner took inspiration from several early pattern books, and his design is reminiscent of a London church by Christopher Wren. The church was the tallest building in the United States from 1810 to 1828. For much of the early 19th century, it was the first landmark travelers saw when approaching Boston.

The church is next to the historic Granary Burying Ground and was site of granary building for which the burial grounds was named. The first worship service was held on January 10, 1810. The church became known as "Brimstone Corner", in part because of the fervent missionary character of its preaching, and in part because of the storage of gunpowder during the War of 1812.

Park Street Church has a strong tradition of missions, evangelical doctrine, and application of Scripture to social issues, as well as a notable list of firsts. Edward Dorr Griffin (1770–1837) served as the first pastor of the Park Street Church and preached a famous series of Sunday evening sermons attacking the New Divinity. In 1816, Park Street Church joined with Old South Church to form the City Mission Society, a social service society to serve Boston's urban poor.

In 1826, Edward Beecher, the brother of Harriet Beecher Stowe and son of Lyman Beecher, a notable abolitionist, became pastor of the church. On July 4, 1829, William Lloyd Garrison delivered his Address to the Colonization Society at Park Street, making his first major public statement against slavery. From 1829–1831, Lowell Mason, a notable Christian composer, served as choirmaster and organist. The church hosted the debut of "My Country, 'Tis of Thee", also known as "America", by Samuel Francis Smith on July 4, 1831. Park Street also played a role in founding the first "Homeland" or American Mission to the Sandwich Islands (now Hawaii), where that church still stands; the Handel and Haydn Society started there.  Benjamin E. Bates, an industrialist who founded Bates College in Maine in 1855, was a Sunday school teacher and active attendant of Park Street in the mid-19th century. In 1857–58, evangelist Charles Finney led a revival at Park Street which led the pastor, Andrew Leete Stone, to experience a spiritual awakening.

Gleason Archer, a prominent inerrantist theologian was the assistant pastor of Park Street from 1945 to 1948, and his father, Suffolk University founder Gleason Archer Sr., served as president of the Park Street Men's Club in the 1920s. In 1949, Billy Graham's first transcontinental mid-century crusade began at Park Street.  Harold J. Ockenga, notable theologian and co-architect of the (Neo-)Evangelical movement was the senior pastor from 1936 to 1969, and during this time co-founded Gordon-Conwell Theological Seminary with Billy Graham, co-founded Fuller Theological Seminary, the National Association of Evangelicals, War Relief (which later became World Relief), and the Christian publication Christianity Today.

In 1974, the church built a Church Ministries Building at 1 Park Street beside the main edifice. Designed in a modernist architectural style by Stahl/Bennett Associates with a concrete structure, window-walls and purplish brick facing, the building is described by the Boston Preservation Alliance as follows: "The Church Ministries Building Addition to Park Street Church breaks dramatically with its surroundings in style, while relating coherently to it in materials. The building rises with large panes of glass stretching across its narrow facade and handsome red brick covering the rest of the building. The ground floor is glass and looks out to the Granary Burial Ground beyond the building to the rear".

In the 1990s, the church purchased the 2 and 3 Park Street buildings from Houghton-Mifflin.

Today

The church still holds to its Statement of Faith adopted by the church in 1877 and readopted in 2003. After 200 years, the church is still engaged in current social issues. For example, Park Street Church  helped launch a private high school in Hyde Park, Boston Trinity Academy, in 2002, to help address the educational needs of inner-city Boston (more than 70% of its students are on scholarship and more than 50% are minorities); it hosts many English as a Second Language classes during the week; it has and supports ministries for the homeless, such as Boston Rescue Mission and Park Street's Starlight Ministry and Thursday Evening Outreach; it partners with crisis pregnancy centers Daybreak Pregnancy Resource Center and A Woman's Concern; it provides English classes for international students and immigrants. There are many affinity groups including ministries for young adults, college students, international students and scholars, children and teens, as well as introductory classes on Christianity and various adult education classes. There is also a ministry called Alive in Christ, an affiliate of Hope for Wholeness.

Park Street is an international congregation, with members from more than 60 countries. The church attracts many regular worshipers from among the undergraduates, graduate students, and faculty at Boston-area universities.  Park Street believes strongly in education integrated with faith, so it is associated with Park Street Kids, Park Street School, and Boston Trinity Academy, as well as partnering with Campus Crusade for Christ and InterVarsity Christian Fellowship for undergraduate and graduate ministries, and a long-time partnership with Gordon-Conwell Theological Seminary.

Boston Mayor Menino announced February 27, 2009, as Park Street Day in honor of its bicentennial.

Senior ministers (1811–present)

Edward D. Griffin 1811–1815
Sereno E. Dwight 1817–1826
Edward Beecher 1826–1830
Joel H. Linsley 1832–1835
Silas Aiken 1837–1848
Andrew Leete Stone 1849–1866
William H.H. Murray 1868–1874
John L. Withrow 1876–1887; 1898–1907
David Gregg 1887–1890
Isaac J. Lansing 1893–1897
Arcturus Z. Conrad 1905–1937
Harold J. Ockenga 1936–1969
Paul E. Toms 1969–1989
David C. Fisher  1989–1995
Pablo Polischuk (Interim) 1995–1997
Gordon P. Hugenberger 1997–2017
 Phil Thorne (Interim) 2017–2019
 Mark L. Booker 2020–

Images

References

Further reading
 The semi-centennial celebration of the Park Street Church and Society: held on the Lords̓ Day, February 27, 1859 : with the festival on the following day. H. Hoyt, 1861
 Committee for the Preservation of Park Street Church, Boston. The preservation of Park Street Church, Boston. Ellis, 1903.
 Arcturus Z. Conrad. Commemorative exercises at the one hundredth anniversary of the organization of Park Street Church, February 26–March 3, 1909. Published by the Park Street Centennial Committee, 1909.
 Rosell, Garth M. Boston's Historic Park Street Church, commissioned by Park Street Church for the bicentennial. Kregel Publications, 2009.

External links

 http://www.historicnewengland.org/catalog/images/pr0020_lg.jpg

Religious organizations established in 1809
Churches in Boston
Towers in Massachusetts
Clock towers in Massachusetts
19th-century Protestant churches
Churches completed in 1810
Congregational churches in Boston
Conservative Congregational Christian Conference churches in Massachusetts
1809 establishments in Massachusetts